Compsoctena isopetra is a moth in the family Eriocottidae. It was described by Edward Meyrick in 1921. It is found in South Africa and Zimbabwe.

The wingspan is about 18 mm. The forewings are light grey, thinly and irregularly speckled with whitish and dark grey and with a whitish costal edge. The hindwings are grey.

References

Moths described in 1921
Compsoctena
Lepidoptera of South Africa
Insects of Zimbabwe